Juan Carlos Rodríguez (born 2 February 1956) is a Spanish judoka. He competed in the men's half-middleweight event at the 1976 Summer Olympics.

References

1956 births
Living people
Spanish male judoka
Olympic judoka of Spain
Judoka at the 1976 Summer Olympics
Sportspeople from Las Palmas
20th-century Spanish people